The 90th District of the Iowa House of Representatives in the state of Iowa.

Current elected officials
Cindy Winckler is the representative currently representing the district.

Past representatives
The district has previously been represented by:
 Charles Strothman, 1971–1973
 Mattie Harper, 1973–1977
 Donald Gettings, 1977–1983
 Robert Skow, 1983–1989
 David Hibbard, 1989–1993
 David F. Schrader, 1993–2003
 John Whitaker, 2003–2009
 Curtis Hanson, 2009–2013
 Cindy Winckler, 2013–present

References

090